"Hellraiser (Remix)" is a 1994 single by East Coast hip hop group The Beatnuts. It was released by Relativity Records as a single with "Fried Chicken" as its b-side. The song "Hellraiser" is found on The Beatnuts' first full-length album Street Level, but the remix was only released as a single. The remix is produced by The Beatnuts and features raps by JuJu, Psycho Les and Fashion. Its lyrics are mainly about violent braggadocios threats. It contains a slow and instrumental that matches the nature of its lyrics. "Hellraiser (Remix)" failed to chart and is one of the rarer Beatnuts singles.

Single track list

A-Side
 "Hellraiser (Remix) (Dirty)"
 "Hellraiser (Remix) (Radio)"
 "Hellraiser (Remix) (Instrumental)"

B-Side
 "Fried Chicken (Dirty)"
 "Fried Chicken (Radio)"
 "Fried Chicken (Instrumental)"

Hellraiser (Remix)
Hellraiser (Remix)
1994 songs
Relativity Records singles